Il mio amico may refer to:
 Il mio amico (Madame song)
 Il mio amico (Anna Tatangelo song)